The Schwennigke, also Schwenke, is a river in Saxony, Germany, and a left-hand tributary of the Schnauder. It rises in the Gleinaer Grund and runs from Tröglitz for a distance of about  through the Elster water meadows parallel to the White Elster, before emptying into the Schnauder at Audigast near Groitzsch.

See also 
List of rivers of Saxony

References 

Rivers of Saxony
Rivers of Germany